Fadil Novalić (born 25 September 1959) is a Bosnian politician serving as the 9th Prime Minister of the Federation of Bosnia and Herzegovina since March 2015.

Novalić graduated from the University of Sarajevo in 1983. He then worked for a number of years in the company TMD "Gradačac Famos", going from constructor to director. Later he moved on to head the company TMD "Automotive Industry" ("Cimos" TMD). Novalić was dismissed from Cimos in 2013 for alleged abuse of powers. He also chaired the Association of Businessmen of Gradačac and hometown football club Zvijezda Gradačac.

Following the 2014 general election, Novalić was appointed Federal Prime Minister in 2015. He remained in office after the 2018 general election. As Federal Prime Minister, he has been one of the high ranking officials that has led Bosnia and Herzegovina's ongoing response to the COVID-19 pandemic. In more recent time, Novalić has been involved in the "Ventilators affair" corruption scandal, regarding his alleged role in "illegal import" of medical ventilators.

Novalić has been a member of the Party of Democratic Action and also its Presidency since 2015.

Early career
Novalić is an entrepreneur and a mechanical engineer by profession. He is credited for reviving the automotive industry in his hometown of Gradačac after serving in the Army of the Republic of Bosnia and Herzegovina during the Bosnian War. While Novalić was a soldier of the 107th Gradačac brigade during the war, he lost two fingers.

Novalić graduated from the Faculty of Mechanical Engineering at the University of Sarajevo in 1983. He then worked for 17 years in the company TMD "Gradačac Famos", going from constructor to director. In 2000, he moved on to head the company TMD "Automotive Industry" ("Cimos" TMD). Novalić was dismissed from Cimos in 2013 for alleged abuse of powers, despite protests by employees in his support. He also founded at least seven other companies, including "Supfina". He was on the supervisory boards of the companies "Wagner - Automotive" and "Namještaj" d.d. Novalić also chaired the Association of Businessmen of Gradačac and football club Zvijezda Gradačac.

He has been a member of the Party of Democratic Action (SDA) since 2015, and has even before been the chairman of the Board of the Council for Economic and Financial Policy of the Party. Novalić has been a member of the SDA Presidency also since 2015. He has authored much of the SDA's economic programme.

Federal Prime Minister (2015–present)
In March 2015, Novalić was appointed by the SDA to head the government of the Federation of Bosnia and Herzegovina entity, in coalition with the Croatian Democratic Union (HDZ BiH). He remained in office after the 2018 general election, since the formation of a new government has been blocked by the HDZ BiH.

Defense industry controversy
Novalić stirred controversy after announcing the results of his government’s success at reviving the Federal defense industry, among which was the increased range of Bosnian grenades. Bakir Izetbegović, the president of the SDA which appointed Novalić, doubled down on the confidence asserting that weapons production will continue, both to increase exports and for the "God forbid, it comes to it" scenario of another aggression and attempted genocide. Bosnian Serb leader Milorad Dodik accused the Federation of “illegal weapon production” after these events.

Environmental activism
Novalić has stood up against the proliferation of small hydroelectric dams in the Federation of Bosnia and Herzegovina, which has some of the most biodiverse rivers in Europe. His stance - that clean rivers are more important than domestic electricity production - made him a notable figure in the world of environmental activism in 2020, when prominent American actor Leonardo DiCaprio referenced his call to action while urging the Federal Government to protect the most biodiverse rivers remaining in Europe himself.

"Ventilators affair" corruption scandal
Novalić was detained for questioning and then arrested on 28 May 2020, for his alleged role in "illegal import" of medical ventilators by "FH Srebrena malina", a raspberry processing firm recruited for that purpose by the Federal Department of Civil Protection. He is also facing money laundering charges by the same indictment.

100 ventilators were acquired from a Chinese company at a price of 10.5 million KM. Although the acquisition happened at a time of heightened demand, a period during which “a global battle to acquire ventilators” was underway, it was painted as problematic by media outlets critical of Novalić’s party. Articles by news portals were the basis for the indictment, as confirmed by the head of the Prosecutor's Office of Bosnia and Herzegovina, Gordana Tadić, in an interview given on Face TV in May 2020.

Also arrested alongside Novalić were the Federal Minister of Finance Jelka Miličević, suspended Director of the Federal Department for Civilian Protection Fahrudin Solak, and the CEO and co-owner of the "FH Srebrena malina", Fikret Hodžić.

The indictment of Milićević was separated from the indictment of the three arrested Bosniaks. This was surprising and raised suspicions about the motives behind the process itself. This would allegedly be in line with other pressures used to achieve the same goal during the pandemic, such as the HDZ BiH’s blockade of COVID-19 vaccine procurement at one time.

Personal life
Fadil is married to Selvija Novalić with whom he has three daughters.

On 13 July 2020, it was confirmed that he tested positive for COVID-19, amid its pandemic in Bosnia and Herzegovina; by 26 July, he recovered. On 25 August 2021, Novalić received his first dose of the Sinopharm BIBP COVID-19 vaccine.

References

External links

Fadil Novalić at imovinapoliticara.cin.ba

1959 births
Living people
People from Gradačac
Bosnia and Herzegovina Muslims
Politicians of the Federation of Bosnia and Herzegovina
Party of Democratic Action politicians
Prime ministers of the Federation of Bosnia and Herzegovina